A bedel is an administrative official at universities in several European countries.

Bedel may also refer to:

 Bedel (surname)
 Bedel (occupation), a title given to a Saxon officer who summoned householders to council
 Bedel Pass, a mountain pass in the Tian-Shan mountain range

See also 
 Bedell (disambiguation)
 Beadle (disambiguation)
 Beedle